EIOffice, also known as Evermore Integrated Office, is a proprietary Office suite by Evermore Software. In 2010, Evermore changed their name to Yozosoft. 

Supported operating systems include Microsoft Windows and Linux. It is marketed internationally in multiple languages. Dell Japan sells the Office suite in partnership with E Frontier, Inc. as an optional package for their Ubuntu Linux netbooks. The EIOffice supports Office Open XML document file formats.

See also
 Office Open XML

References

External links
 Yozosoft homepage 

Office suites for Linux
Office suites
Portable software
Java platform software